Corte-Real, sometimes Corte Real, is a surname of Portuguese origin, which means literally "Royal Court". It may refer to:

People
Corte-Real family, a Portuguese noble family of explorers
João Vaz Corte-Real (died 1496), Portuguese explorer
Miguel Corte-Real (c. 1448–1502), Portuguese explorer
Gaspar Corte-Real (c. 1450–1501), Portuguese explorer and brother of Miguel
Jerónimo Corte-Real (1533–1588), Portuguese epic poet
Manuel de Moura e Corte Real, 2nd Marquis of Castelo Rodrigo (1590–1651), Portuguese Governor of the Spanish Netherlands (1644–1647)

Ships
CMA CGM Corte Real, a containership
NRP Corte Real, more than one Portuguese Navy ship

Portuguese-language surnames